Won-jae is a Korean masculine given name. Its meaning differs based on the hanja used to write each syllable of the name. There are 35 hanja with the reading "won" and 20 hanja with the reading "jae" on the South Korean government's official list of hanja which may registered for use in given names.

People with this name include:
Park Won-jae (born 1984), South Korean footballer
Lee Won-jae (born 1986), South Korean footballer
Song Won-jae (born 1989), South Korean footballer
Eun Won-jae (born 1994), South Korean actor

Fictional characters with this name include:
Hyun Won-jae, in 2007–2010 South Korean manhwa series The Breaker
Park Won-jae, in 2008 South Korean film Crazy Waiting
Choi Won-jae, in 2013 South Korean television series Empire of Gold

See also
List of Korean given names

References

Korean masculine given names